The South African Journal of Botany (Afrikaans title: Suid-Afrikaanse tydskrif vir plantkunde) is a bimonthly peer reviewed scientific journal covering all aspects of botany as related to Southern Africa. It is published by Elsevier on behalf of the South African Association of Botanists, of which it is an official journal. It was established in 1982 and, after publishing 3 volumes, absorbed the Journal of South African Botany as of 1985. The latter journal had been established in 1935 and the merged journal continued the volume numbering of the older one. According to the Journal Citation Reports, the journal has a 2013 impact factor of 1.340.

References

External links 
 
 South African Association of Botanists

Botany journals
Bimonthly journals
Publications established in 1935
Publications established in 1982
Elsevier academic journals
English-language journals
Academic journals associated with learned and professional societies
1982 establishments in South Africa
Academic journals published in South Africa